Loki Laufeyson, known by adoption as Loki Odinson and by his title as the God of Mischief, is a fictional character portrayed by Tom Hiddleston in the Marvel Cinematic Universe (MCU) media franchise, based on the Marvel Comics character of the same name and the Norse mythological god of the same name. Loki was introduced in Thor (2011), and has since become an important recurring figure of the MCU; following the original Loki's death in Avengers: Infinity War (2018), a variant of him from an alternate timeline is introduced in Avengers: Endgame (2019), diverging from the events of The Avengers (2012), headlining the television series Loki (2021) alongside Sylvie, a female variant of him who he works with in the series.

, the character has appeared in eight films, takes the lead role in the live-action series Loki (2021), with a number of alternate timeline variants appearing in Loki, the animated series What If...? (2021), and in The Good, the Bart, and the Loki (2021), an animated short film that serves as a crossover with The Simpsons franchise, including Classic Loki, Kid Loki, Boastful Loki, Alligator Loki, President Loki and more.

Loki's character has borrowed a number of characteristics and storylines from across the history of the character in Marvel Comics. As in the comics, Loki has generally been a villain in the MCU, variously attempting to conquer Asgard or Earth, and having allied himself with more powerful villains to achieve his aims. He has particular antagonism for his adoptive brother Thor, and is known to variously ally with and then betray Thor and others, and to regularly return from apparent death. In his development through the series, he becomes less of a supervillain and more of an antihero.

Concept and creation 
The mythical figure Loki preceded Thor in making his first Marvel Comics appearance, depicted in the science fiction/fantasy anthology title Timely Comics' publication Venus No. 6 (August 1949) as a member of the Olympian gods exiled to the Underworld. However, the current version of Loki made his first official Marvel appearance was in Journey into Mystery No. 85 (October 1962), where Loki was reintroduced as Thor's sworn enemy. The modern age Loki was introduced by brothers and co-writers Stan Lee and Larry Lieber and he was redesigned by Jack Kirby. As one of Thor's arch-nemeses, Loki frequently made appearances in Thor-related titles like Journey into Mystery and Thor, as well as other Marvel Universe titles such as The Avengers and X-Men, as well as brief appearances in the Spider-Man and Defenders comic series.

Live-action film adaptations of characters in the Thor comic books were proposed at various times, but did not come to fruition. In the mid-2000s, Kevin Feige realized that Marvel still owned the rights to the core members of the Avengers, which included Thor. Feige, a self-professed "fanboy", envisioned creating a shared universe just as creators Stan Lee and Jack Kirby had done with their comic books in the early 1960s. In 2006, the film was announced as a Marvel Studios production. In December 2007, Protosevich described his plans for it "to be like a superhero origin story, but not one about a human gaining super powers, but of a god realizing his true potential. It's the story of an Old Testament god who becomes a New Testament god". In 2008, Guillermo del Toro entered talks to direct the film. Del Toro was a fan of Jack Kirby's work on the comics, and said that he loved the character of Loki, but wished to incorporate more of the original Norse mythology into the film, including a "really dingy Valhalla, [with] Vikings and mud". However, del Toro ultimately turned down Thor to direct The Hobbit. Kenneth Branagh entered into negotiations to direct, and by December 2008, Branagh confirmed that he had been hired. He described it as "a human story right in the center of a big epic scenario."

Several actors were reportedly considered for the part, including Josh Hartnett, and Jim Carrey. In May 2009, Marvel announced that Tom Hiddleston, who had worked with Branagh before and had initially been considered to portray the lead role, had been cast as Loki. In June 2009, Feige confirmed that both Chris Hemsworth and Hiddleston had signed on.

Characterization 

Tom Hiddleston stated that "Loki's like a comic book version of Edmund in King Lear, but nastier". Hiddleston stated that he had to keep a strict diet before the start of filming because director Kenneth Branagh "wants Loki to have a lean and hungry look, like Cassius in Julius Caesar. Physically, he can't be posing as Thor". Hiddleston also looked at Peter O'Toole as inspiration for Loki, explaining, "Interestingly enough, [Kenneth Branagh] said to look at Peter O'Toole in two specific films, The Lion in Winter and Lawrence of Arabia. What's interesting about ... his performance [as King Henry] is you see how damaged he is. There's a rawness [to his performance]; it's almost as if he's living with a layer of skin peeled away. He's grandiose and teary and, in a moment, by turns hilarious and then terrifying. What we wanted was that emotional volatility. It's a different acting style, it's not quite the same thing, but it's fascinating to go back and watch an actor as great as O'Toole head for those great high hills". Ted Allpress portrays a young Loki.

About his character's evolution from Thor to The Avengers, Hiddleston said, "I think the Loki we see in The Avengers is further advanced. You have to ask yourself the question: How pleasant an experience is it disappearing into a wormhole that has been created by some kind of super nuclear explosion of his own making? So I think by the time Loki shows up in The Avengers, he's seen a few things." About Loki's motivations, Hiddleston said, "At the beginning of The Avengers, he comes to Earth to subjugate it and his idea is to rule the human race as their king. And like all the delusional autocrats of human history, he thinks this is a great idea because if everyone is busy worshipping him, there will be no wars so he will create some kind of world peace by ruling them as a tyrant. But he is also kind of deluded in the fact that he thinks unlimited power will give him self-respect, so I haven't let go of the fact that he is still motivated by this terrible jealousy and kind of spiritual desolation." Hiddleston also filmed scenes for Avengers: Age of Ultron, but his scenes were omitted from the theatrical cut because director Joss Whedon didn't want the movie to feel "overstuffed".

In Thor: The Dark World, Loki forms an uneasy alliance with Thor against the Dark Elves. On where he wished to take the character in the film, Hiddleston said, "I'd like to take [Loki] to his absolute rock bottom. I'd like to see him yield, essentially, to his darkest instincts. Then, having hit rock bottom, maybe come back up. I think the fascination for me about playing Loki is that, in the history of the mythology and the comic books and the Scandinavian myths, is he's constantly dancing on this fault line of the dark side and redemption." Hiddleston recalled, "When I met Alan [Taylor], he asked me how I thought I could do Loki again without repeating myself and I remembered talking with Kevin Feige when we were on the Avengers promotional tour. I said, 'OK, you've seen Thor and Loki be antagonistic for two films now. It would be amazing to see them fight side by side. I've been the bad guy now twice, so I can't be again, or otherwise I shouldn't be in the film. So we have to find a new role for me to play."

Hiddleston was interested in how Loki's attitude has changed by the events of Thor: Ragnarok, saying, "he is always a trickster. It is trying to find new ways for him to be mischievous". As the ruler of Asgard since the end of Thor: The Dark World (2013), Hiddleston notes that "Loki has devoted most of his efforts to narcissistic self-glorification. Not so much on good governance." He also added that "the idea that Thor might be indifferent to Loki is troubling for him... it's an interesting development".

With respect to Loki's death at the beginning of Infinity War, Hiddleston expressed the opinion that "it's very powerful he calls himself an Odinson, and that closes the whole journey of Loki and what he can do", also noting that Loki's death demonstrates how powerful Thanos is, setting the stage for the fight against him.

In Loki (2021), Loki's sex in the series is denoted by the Time Variance Authority as "fluid", in a nod to the character's genderfluidity in Marvel Comics and Norse mythology. Hiddleston said that the "breadth and range of identity contained in the character has been emphasized and is something I was always aware of when I was first cast 10 years ago...I know it was important to Kate Herron and Michael Waldron and to the whole team. And we were very aware, this is something we felt responsible for."

Appearance and special effects 
Hiddleston has noted that his transformation into Loki has required dyeing his naturally blond hair and making his naturally ruddy skin appear very pale, stating:

Loki's costume in Thor, designed by Marvel's head of visual development Charlie Wen, adapted elements from the comics while adding elements to give it a futuristic feel, reflecting the treatment of magic in the Thor films as merely highly advanced technology. Like other representations of Asgard, particularly including the costumes of Thor and Odin, it also referenced Norse symbols. Wen stated that he "designed Loki's armor to be more overtly ceremonial than practical", in keeping with the character being more focused on scheming for power than engaging in battle.

Hiddleston described the horns worn as part of his Loki costume as weighing about 30 pounds, resulting in one instance during the filming of The Avengers where he asked co-star Chris Hemsworth to really punch him in the face, because the weight of the horns made it difficult to fake being hit.

During the Loki TV series, numerous Loki variants were shown or introduced with varying appearances. With respect to the most prominently featured variant, Sylvie, Loki costume designer Christine Wada and director Kate Herron planned Sylvie to be "mysterious and somewhat androgynous" in the beginning, avoiding her identity reveal to become "a total play on gender", rather, letting the character evolve on her own "as a strong female lead" without over-sexualization. Sylvie's look represents a character that is "a fighter", can stand on her own, and is prepared to engage in battles and runs. Instead of tailor-made armors usually given to female comic book characters to enhance silhouettes, the costume designer intended to not make distinctions between the male and female clothing in the series. Sylvie's costume include a harem drop-crotch pant, which allowed her to emphasize movement equally to a tight pant or a spandex suit. Wada decided to bring that grounded aspect to Sylvie's look into a storyline with magic elements, stating that "I believe it more that somebody can go fight when they're in a rugged boot more than a pair of high heels... function is such a clear and important thing to reference in all good design." In her first appearance, Sylvie wore a broken Loki crown, which she later left behind in the Ark. A version of the character, Lady Loki, wore a similar crown in the comics. Another variant, Classic Loki, wore a costume inspired by the character's 1960s comic design by Jack Kirby.

Fictional character biography

Early life 

Loki was born a Frost Giant and abandoned as an infant by his father Laufey, only to be found by Odin during an invasion of the realm of the Frost Giants in Jotunheim. Odin used magic to make Loki appear Asgardian and raised him as a son alongside Odin's biological son, Thor. During his upbringing, Odin's wife Frigga taught Loki how to use his magic.

He used these powers throughout his life, constantly tricking his adoptive brother Thor, as well as pulling a heist on Earth under the alias D. B. Cooper. He was embittered throughout his upbringing, perceiving that he was neglected by Odin in favor of Thor, and thus grew closer to his adoptive mother Frigga instead.

Betrayal of Asgard 

Hundreds of years later, in 2011, Loki watches as Thor prepares to ascend to the throne of Asgard. This is interrupted by Frost Giants, allowed in to Asgard by Loki, attempting to retrieve an artifact called the Casket, which was captured by Odin in a war centuries before. Loki then manipulates Thor into traveling to Jotunheim against Odin's order to confront Laufey, the Frost Giant leader. A battle ensues until Odin intervenes to save the Asgardians, destroying the fragile truce between the two races. Loki discovers that he is Laufey's biological son, adopted by Odin after the war ended. After Odin exiles Thor to Earth, Loki confronts Odin about his parentage, and a weary Odin falls into the deep "Odinsleep" to recover his strength. Loki takes the throne in Odin's stead and offers Laufey the chance to kill Odin and retrieve the Casket. Sif and the Warriors Three, unhappy with Loki, attempt to return Thor from exile, convincing Heimdall, gatekeeper of the Bifröst—the means of traveling between worlds—to allow them passage to Earth. Aware of their plan, Loki sends the Destroyer, a seemingly indestructible automaton, to pursue them and kill Thor. The Destroyer leaves Thor on the verge of death but his sacrifice sees him become worthy of returning from exile and he regains his powers and defeats the Destroyer. Afterward, Thor leaves with his fellow Asgardians to confront Loki. In Asgard, Loki betrays and kills Laufey, revealing his true plan to use Laufey's attempt on Odin's life as an excuse to destroy Jotunheim with the Bifröst, thus proving himself worthy to Odin. Thor arrives and fights Loki before destroying the Bifröst to stop Loki's plan, stranding himself in Asgard. Odin awakens and prevents the brothers from falling into the abyss created in the wake of the bridge's destruction, but after Odin rejects Loki's pleas for approval, Loki allows himself to fall into the abyss.

In space, Loki encounters the Other, the leader of an extraterrestrial race known as the Chitauri. In exchange for retrieving the Tesseract, a powerful energy source of unknown potential, the Other promises Loki an army with which he can subjugate Earth. Later, Erik Selvig is taken to a S.H.I.E.L.D. facility, where Nick Fury opens a briefcase and asks him to study a mysterious cube. Loki, invisible, prompts Selvig to agree, and he does.

Invasion of New York 

In 2012, Loki attacks a remote S.H.I.E.L.D. research facility, using a scepter that controls people's minds and which, unknown to him, amplifies his hatred for Thor and the inhabitants of Earth. He uses the scepter to brainwash Clint Barton and Dr. Erik Selvig, and steals the Tesseract. In Stuttgart, Barton steals iridium needed to stabilize the Tesseract's power while Loki causes a distraction, leading to a brief confrontation with Steve Rogers, Tony Stark, and Natasha Romanoff that ends with Loki allowing himself to get captured. While Loki is being escorted to S.H.I.E.L.D. on the Quinjet, Thor arrives and takes him away, hoping to convince him to abandon his plan. However, Thor eventually takes Loki to S.H.I.E.L.D.'s flying aircraft carrier, the Helicarrier. Upon arrival, Loki is imprisoned while Bruce Banner and Stark attempt to locate the Tesseract. Agents possessed by Loki attack the Helicarrier, disabling one of its engines in flight and causing Banner to transform into the Hulk. Thor attempts to stop the Hulk's rampage, and Loki kills the agent Phil Coulson and ejects Thor from the Helicarrier as he escapes. Loki uses the Tesseract, in conjunction with a device Selvig built, to open a wormhole above Stark Tower in New York City to the Chitauri fleet in space, launching his invasion. The Avengers arrive and rally in defense of the city. As the Chitauri are ultimately defeated, the Hulk attacks Loki and beats him into submission in the Tower, before Loki is arrested and taken to Asgard.

Loki is captured by the Avengers and brought back to Asgard by Thor to be imprisoned for his crimes on Midgard (Earth) using the Tesseract.

Battle with the Dark Elves 

In 2013, Dark Elves led by Malekith attack Asgard, searching for Jane Foster, whose body has been invaded by an unearthly force known as the Aether. Malekith and his monstrous lieutenant Kurse kill Loki's adoptive mother Frigga, who had taught Loki magic. Thor reluctantly frees Loki, who agrees to take Thor to a secret portal to Svartalfheim, home of the dark elves, in return for Thor's promise to take vengeance for their mother. In Svartalfheim, Loki appears to betray Thor, in fact tricking Malekith into drawing the Aether out of Jane, but Thor's attempt to destroy the exposed substance fails. Malekith merges with the Aether and leaves in his ship as Loki appears to be fatally wounded saving Thor from Kurse, whom Loki was able to kill through trickery. Thor ultimately defeats Malekith in a battle in Greenwich, and returns to Asgard to decline Odin's offer to take the throne, and tells Odin of Loki's sacrifice. After Thor leaves, it is shown that Loki has actually survived and taken Odin's place on the throne, disguised as Odin.

Destruction of Asgard 

From 2013 to 2017, Loki rules Asgard disguised as Odin, having kept the real Odin under a spell on Earth. During this time, the disguised Loki sends Sif to Earth on a mission and later banishes her from Asgard.

In 2017, Thor returns to Asgard and discovers Loki's ruse, making Loki reveal himself to the shocked Asgardians. After Loki tells Thor where Odin is, he is taken by Thor back to Earth to New York City. Loki is trapped through a portal by Stephen Strange as a threat to Earth, before him and Thor are sent into another portal in to Norway, where they find a dying Odin, who explains that his passing will allow his firstborn child, Hela, to escape from a prison she was sealed in long ago. Hela appears, destroying Mjölnir to Loki's shock, and forces Thor and Loki from the Bifröst out into space. Loki lands on the planet Sakaar, and quickly ingratiates himself to the ruler of that world, the Grandmaster. Thor later crash-lands on Sakaar and is captured by the slave trader Valkyrie, a former member of the ancient order of Valkyries defeated by Hela. After convincing Valkyrie and Loki to help, they steal a ship with which to escape through a wormhole to Asgard – but not before Loki again attempts to betray Thor, causing Thor to leave Loki behind on Sakaar. However, Loki is found by Korg, Miek, and others who join him aboard a large vessel stolen from the Grandmaster called the Statesman. He leads them to return to Asgard and help the Asgardians escape the battle between Thor and Hela's forces, proclaiming himself their savior in the process. During the battle, on Thor's order, Loki goes to Odin's treasure room and places the crown of Surtur in the eternal flame kept there, thus causing an enormous form of Surtur to appear and destroy Hela and Asgard. In the process of doing so however, he steals the Tesseract from Odin's treasure vault. Thor, crowned king, decides to take the Asgardians to Earth despite Loki's concerns about how he will be received there.

Death 

While en-route to Earth, in 2018, Loki and Thor are intercepted by a large spacecraft carrying Thanos and his children, alerted to their location by the presence of the Tesseract secretly being held by Loki. After wiping out half of the Asgardians onboard while the rest flee via escape pods, Thanos, wielding the Power Stone, overpowers Thor and Hulk, kills Heimdall, and claims the Space Stone from the Tesseract that Loki hands over to him in order to spare Thor's life. In a last act of self-sacrifice, Loki pretends to swear allegiance to Thanos, only to attempt to stab his throat. Thanos intercepts the attack with one of his infinity stones, and kills Loki by snapping his neck, leaving his body to be cradled in his brother's arms.

2012 variant

Capture and learning his original fate 

A variant of Loki, dubbed Variant L1130, retrieves the Tesseract in an alternate 2012 during the Avengers' "Time Heist" and escapes following the Battle of New York, forming a new timeline. Loki escapes into Mongolia and is taken into custody by the Time Variance Authority (TVA), while the new timeline is reset and destroyed.

TVA judge Ravonna Renslayer labels him a rogue variant to be "reset". However, TVA agent Mobius M. Mobius intervenes and takes Loki to a Time Theatre where he reviews Loki's past misdeeds and questions his real motive for hurting people. After realizing that the Infinity Stones cannot help him, as well as viewing his would-be future on the "Sacred Timeline", including his own death at the hand of Thanos, Loki agrees to help Mobius stop a rogue variant of himself.

Working with the Time Variance Authority 

Loki joins a TVA mission following an ambush by the fugitive Loki Variant in 1985 Oshkosh, Wisconsin. Loki stalls for time, but Mobius understands his plan. After some research, Loki proposes that the Variant is hiding near apocalyptic events like Asgard's Ragnarök, where the impending destruction means their actions cannot change the timeline, thus concealing them from the TVA. Loki and Mobius confirm this possibility by visiting Pompeii in 79 AD. Travelling to 2050 Alabama, they encounter The Variant, who rejects Loki's offer to work together to overthrow the Time-Keepers, before revealing herself as a female variant of Loki. The Variant then uses TVA Reset Charges to "bomb" the timeline, creating new timeline branches to keep the organization's minutemen busy, before escaping through a portal to the TVA to assassinate the Time-Keepers, with Loki in pursuit.

Allying with Sylvie 

After a confrontation at the TVA, Loki teleports the Variant to Lamentis-1, a planet set to be destroyed by a meteor shower, using their TemPad. Both are unable to escape due to the TemPad having run out of power. Agreeing to ally with one another, the Variant introduces herself to Loki by the alias "Sylvie" and proposes a truce in order to escape the planet. The pair sneak aboard a train bound for the Ark, a spaceship intended to evacuate Lamentis-1, in order to siphon its power and recharge the TemPad. On the train, Loki gets drunk and starts a ruckus, causing him and Sylvie to be discovered and forced out by the guards. While walking to the Ark in order to instead hijack it and leave the planet, to prevent it from being destroyed as according to the Sacred Timeline, Loki enquires about Sylvie's enchantment ability, learning that the agents of the TVA are variants themselves; Loki reveals to Sylvie that the TVA agents, including Mobius, are not aware that they are variants. With the TemPad broken, the pair fight their way through the guards and through a meteor shower to the Ark, only to witness it being destroyed by a meteor just as they get to it, leaving them stranded.

On Lamentis-1, Sylvie tells Loki she escaped the TVA when she was about to be arrested as a child. Loki and Sylvie form a romantic bond, creating a branched timeline never seen by the TVA. Mobius rescues the two from Lamentis and has them both arrested, punishing Loki by leaving him in a time loop from his past. After Mobius derides Loki for having fallen in love with Sylvie, Loki tells him that everyone working for the TVA are variants, which Mobius investigates. Now aware of his background upon finding proof, Mobius frees Loki from the loop, but is soon confronted by Renslayer and pruned. Loki and Sylvie are taken to the Time-Keepers, accompanied by Renslayer and her minutemen. Hunter B-15 intervenes, freeing Loki and Sylvie of their time twisting collars, and in the ensuing fight, the minutemen are killed whilst Renslayer is knocked unconscious by Sylvie. Sylvie then beheads one of the Time-Keepers, who turn out to all be androids. Loki prepares to tell Sylvie about his feelings, but Renslayer regains consciousness and prunes him. He awakens in a post-apocalyptic world, dubbed "the Void", with multiple other Loki variants, who invite him to join them.

Surviving in the Void 

Loki learns from his other variants that a cloud-like creature named Alioth guards the Void and prevents anyone from escaping. Boastful Loki attempts to betray the other Lokis for another Loki variant (who was elected president in his timeline), causing a fight to ensue, forcing Loki and his variant allies to escape. After reuniting with Loki, Sylvie proposes a plan to approach Alioth and enchant it, in hopes that it will lead them to the real mastermind behind the TVA's creation, whilst Mobius teleports back to the TVA. Kid Loki and Reptile Loki escape while Classic Loki creates a large illusion of Asgard to distract Alioth and sacrifices himself in the process. This allows Loki and Sylvie to successfully enchant the creature and move past the Void. Noticing a citadel in the foreground, the pair walk towards it.

Meeting He Who Remains 

In the Citadel at the End of Time, Loki and Sylvie meet Miss Minutes and reject an offer from her creator, "He Who Remains", to return them to the timeline with everything they desire. He Who Remains reveals to Loki and Sylvie that he created the TVA after ending a multiversal war caused by his variants. As the timeline begins to branch, he offers them a choice: kill him and end the singular timeline, causing another multiversal war, or become his successors in overseeing the TVA. Sylvie decides to kill him, while Loki pleads with her to stop. They kiss, but Sylvie sends Loki back to TVA headquarters. At TVA headquarters, Loki warns B-15 and Mobius about variants of He Who Remains, but they do not recognize him. Loki sees that a statue in the likeness of He Who Remains has replaced those of the Time-Keepers.

Tracking Variants of He Who Remains 

Terrified about the variants of He Who Remains created in the infinite time that passed while he was on the Citadel, Loki convinces Mobius to seek out to find where other variants may be, travelling with him to an alternate 1901, where they attended Victor Timely's campaign, an oblivious Mobius enjoying his speech as Loki identifies Timely as one of the variants.

Other variants

2013 variant 

An alternate version of Loki from the events of Thor: The Dark World briefly appears in Avengers: Endgame. In an alternate 2013, Thor and Rocket travel to Asgard to take the Reality Stone, passing unnoticed by a bored Loki in his holding cell at the dungeons.

Loki 

Multiple "variants" of Loki in addition to the 2012 variant appear in Loki.

Sylvie 

Sylvie (portrayed by Sophia Di Martino as an adult and by Cailey Fleming as a child) is a female variant of Loki who seeks to "free" the Sacred Timeline from the TVA, developing a method of body possession to achieve her ends. She later falls in love with the 2012 variant of Loki. Sylvie was first taken into custody by the TVA as a little girl, but escaped, and thereafter spent her life evading them.

Other variants 

 A variant of Loki dubbed "" (portrayed by DeObia Oparei) wields a hammer and makes wild exaggerations about his accomplishments (including claiming to have defeated Captain America and Iron Man, and obtained the Infinity Stones). Boastful Loki attempts to betray the Classic, Kid, and Alligator variants by allying with President Loki to rule the Void, but fails.
 A reptilian variant of Loki dubbed "" lives in the Void with fellow Loki variants. Loki head writer Michael Waldron included him "because he's green", describing it as an "irreverent" addition. Director Kate Herron used a "cartoony" stuffed alligator during filming, allowing actors to interact with it, with the onscreen version rendered using CGI.
 A younger variant of Loki dubbed "" (portrayed by Jack Veal) created a Nexus event by killing Thor. He considers himself the king of the Void although it seems only Classic Loki and Alligator Loki respect this title. He is based on the Marvel Comics character of the same name.
 An elderly variant of Loki dubbed "" (portrayed by Richard E. Grant) grew old on an isolated planet after tricking Thanos and faking his death. Classic Loki has the ability to conjure larger, more elaborate illusions than Loki. This version sacrifices himself when creating an illusion of Asgard to allow Sylvie and Loki to enchant Alioth. His costume was inspired by his 1960s comic design by Jack Kirby.
 A variant of Loki dubbed "" (portrayed by Tom Hiddleston) created a Nexus event by becoming a president in his timeline. He attempts to rule the Void with an army of other variants, and is at odds with Kid Loki. Hiddleston called President Loki "the worst of the bad bunch", describing him as "the least vulnerable, the most autocratic and terrifyingly ambitious character who seems to have no empathy or care for anyone else". His costume design and characterisation was inspired by the comic miniseries Vote Loki by Christopher Hastings.
 A series of holographs of Loki variants are shown in a scene in the TVA, including one with the blue skin of a Frost Giant, another wearing the yellow jersey of the Tour de France leader and holding the race trophy, a third with a Hulk-like heavily muscled form, a fourth long-bearded variant with hooves, and a fifth appearing more like a traditional viking.
 Multiple Loki variants are shown to be part of President Loki's crew, including "Glamshades Loki" (the aforementioned long-bearded variant with hooves), "Poky Loki", "In Prison Loki", and "Bicycle Loki". These variants were named by costume designer Christine Wada.

What If...? 

Several alternate versions of Loki appear in the animated series What If...?, with Hiddleston reprising his role.

Conquering the Earth 

In an alternate 2011, following the death of Thor during his exile to Earth, Loki arrives with the Asgardian army to avenge him. Confronted by Nick Fury and S.H.I.E.L.D., he defeats them using the Casket of Ancient Winters before threatening to turn the entire world into ice. After negotiating with Fury, he agrees to give him until the next sunrise to find his brother's killer, whom Fury deduces to be Hank Pym. The two confront him in San Francisco and defeat him, but Loki decides to remain on Earth and quickly becomes its ruler while ending all conflict on Earth.

Sometime later, Fury assembles a resistance movement to overthrow Loki and a battle ensues between S.H.I.E.L.D. and Loki's Asgardian forces. Just as Loki is about to claim victory, the Watcher brings in a Natasha Romanoff from another reality where Ultron possessed Vision's body and killed the Avengers. She proceeds to subdue Loki with his Scepter.

Frost Giant prince 

In an alternate 965 A.D., Odin returns an infant Loki to Laufey rather than adopting him, resulting in Loki growing up to be the Frost Giant prince of Jotunheim. Loki and Thor later meet under unknown circumstances and become best friends. In 2011, Loki attends Thor's intergalactic party on Earth alongside his fellow Frost Giants, who vandalize Mount Rushmore. Loki accidentally prevents Jane Foster from contacting Thor when, due to his large Frost Giant fingers, he drops and breaks Thor's cell phone. He and his Frost Giants later send the London Eye spinning off into one direction. When Thor intimidates the party guests into cleaning up while also mentioning that Frigga is coming, Loki's fellow Frost Giants put the London Eye back on its stand.

Reception 
The character of Loki "has been a fan favorite ever since his central role in 2012's The Avengers", becoming "one of the MCU's most beloved characters". Hiddleston has received a number of nominations and awards for his performance of the character.

Accolades

See also 
Characters of the Marvel Cinematic Universe
Norse mythology in popular culture

Notes

References

External links 
 Loki on the Marvel Cinematic Universe Wiki
 Loki (2012 variant)  on the Marvel Cinematic Universe Wiki
 
 Loki on Marvel.com

Adoptee characters in films
Avengers (film series)
Fictional LGBT characters in film
Fictional LGBT characters in television
Fictional bisexual males
Fictional characters from parallel universes
Fictional characters who use magic
Fictional characters with slowed ageing
Fictional characters with superhuman durability or invulnerability
Fictional gods
Fictional illusionists
Fictional impostors
Fictional kings
Fictional knife-fighters
Fictional murdered people
Fictional murderers
Fictional non-binary people
Fictional patricides
Fictional pranksters
Fictional princes
Fictional tricksters
Film characters introduced in 2011
Film supervillains
Loki
Loki (TV series)
Male characters in film
Male film villains
Marvel Cinematic Universe characters
Marvel Comics Asgardians
Marvel Comics LGBT superheroes
Marvel Comics LGBT supervillains
Marvel Comics characters who are shapeshifters
Marvel Comics characters who use magic
Marvel Comics characters with accelerated healing
Marvel Comics characters with superhuman strength
Marvel Comics extraterrestrial supervillains
Marvel Comics giants
Marvel Comics male superheroes
Marvel Comics male supervillains
Marvel Comics telekinetics
Norse mythology in popular culture
Orphan characters in film
Orphan characters in television
Thor (film series)
Time travelers